Antennaria arcuata, the box pussytoes, is a North American species of plants in the family Asteraceae. It grows in the western part of the United States, in the States of Idaho (Blaine County), Wyoming (Fremont + Sublette Counties), and Nevada (Elko County).

References

External links
photo of herbarium specimen at University of California @ Berkeley, isotype of Antennaria arcuata, collected in Idaho

arcuata
Flora of the Western United States
Plants described in 1950
Taxa named by Arthur Cronquist